The Rutgers Computer and Technology Law Journal, founded in 1969 at Rutgers School of Law–Newark, is the world's oldest and longest running academic journal dealing with the interaction of law and technology. It is a student-run, law review–style publication, and two issues are published each year.  The journal's staff is selected through a writing competition held at the end of each academic year.

References

External links
Rutgers Computer and Technology Law Journal official website
Rutgers Law School official website

American law journals
Technology law journals
Law journals edited by students
English-language journals
Publications established in 1969
Computer and Technology Law Journal
Computer and Technology Law Journal